Vasile Ion (born 1 January, 1956) is a former Romanian rugby union football player. He played as a fullback.

Club career
Ion played for RCJ Farul Constanța, with which he won a Masters tournament in France alongside Romeo Bezuscu, Florea Opris, Adrian Lungu and Emilian Grigore.

International career
Ion was first capped for Romania during the 1979-80 FIRA Trophy, during the match against Morocco in Casablanca, on 30 April 1980. He was also called up for the Romania team at the 1987 Rugby World Cup, playing all the three pool stage matches, with the match against Scotland being his last cap, where he scored a penalty and converted a try.

Honours
Farul Constanța
 Cupa României: 1986-87

References

External links

1956 births
Living people
Romanian rugby union players
Romania international rugby union players
Rugby union fullbacks